During the 1961–62 season Hibernian, a football club based in Edinburgh, came eighth out of 18 clubs in the Scottish First Division.

Scottish First Division

Final League table

Scottish League Cup

Group stage

Group 1 final table

Scottish Cup

Inter-Cities Fairs Cup

See also
List of Hibernian F.C. seasons

References

External links
Hibernian 1961/1962 results and fixtures, Soccerbase

Hibernian F.C. seasons
Hibernian